Ellen Carol DuBois is a professor of history and gender studies. She has taught at the University at Buffalo and ended her career at the University of California, Los Angeles (UCLA). DuBois retired from UCLA in 2017. She is known for her pioneering work in women's history and for her history books.

Biography 
DuBois became interested in history while in her senior year of high school. She earned a B.A. from Wellesley College in 1968 and a Ph.D. from Northwestern University in 1975. DuBois became interested in the women's liberation movement while she was a graduate student and started working with the Chicago Women's Liberation Union. Her interest in the movement led to her becoming "one of the early pioneers of women's history," according to People's World. Her work focused on the importance of formal politics and women's history.

After teaching at the University at Buffalo for 16 years, she moved to Los Angeles to continue teaching at University of California, Los Angeles (UCLA). She retired from UCLA in 2017.

Awards
In 1998, she won the Joan Kelly Memorial Prize of the American Historical Association for her book about Harriot Stanton Blatch, Harriot Stanton Blatch and the Winning of Woman Suffrage (Yale University Press, 1997).

Selected publications

 "Working Women, Class Relations and Suffrage Militance: Harriot Stanton Blatch and the New York Woman Suffrage Movement, 1894-1910", Journal of American History, June 1987
 Feminism and Suffrage: The Emergence of an Independent Women's Movement in America 1848-1869  (1978)
 Through Women's Eyes: An American History with Documents (with Lynn Dumenil) (2005)
 Suffrage: Women's Long Battle for the Vote (2020)

References

1947 births
Living people
Wellesley College alumni
Northwestern University alumni
University at Buffalo faculty
University of California, Los Angeles faculty
21st-century American historians
American women historians
Gender studies academics
21st-century American women
Historians from California